Kyrylo Serhiyovych Kovalets (born 2 July 1993) is a Ukrainian professional football midfielder who plays for Oleksandriya in the Ukrainian Premier League.

Career
Kyrylo Kovalets is product of youth team systems of FC Metalist Kharkiv. Made his debut for FC Obolon entering as a substituted player in game against FC Illichivets Mariupol on 22 October 2011 in Ukrainian Premier League.

Personal life
His father Serhiy Kovalets, a native of Crimea, is a former international Ukrainian football midfielder, and current football manager.

He is married to Olena, a sister of another Ukrainian football player Roman Zozulya, and has two children.

References

External links
 
 

1993 births
Living people
Footballers from Kyiv
Ukrainian footballers
FC Obolon-Brovar Kyiv players
FC Shakhtar-3 Donetsk players
FC Chornomorets Odesa players
FC Oleksandriya players
Ukrainian Premier League players
Ukrainian Second League players
Association football midfielders
Ukraine under-21 international footballers